Marcus Vondell Faison (born February 18, 1978) is a Belgian-American former professional basketball player. He played Division I basketball for Siena College prior to his professional career. Was a prep standout at Irvin High School in El Paso, Texas.

College career
Faison played for Siena College in Loudonville, New York from 1996 to 2000. As a four-year starter, he was the leading scorer on teams that reached three consecutive Metro Atlantic Athletic Conference (MAAC) championship games from 1997–2000. He appeared in one NCAA tournament game in 1999, scoring 18 points in a loss to the #4 seeded Arkansas Razorbacks. As a senior, he led Siena to a 24–9 record and an appearance in the National Invitation Tournament. He graduated in 2000 as Siena's third leading scorer in school history. He was named to the All-MAAC First Team three times and to the conference's 25th anniversary team in January 2006.

Pro career
Faison joined Beşiktaş Cola Turka for the 2008–09 season. In January 2009, he left Beşiktaş because of economic problems and later signed with Peristeri in Greece.

References

External links 
Euroleague.net Profile
ACB.com Profile

1978 births
Living people
African-American basketball players
American expatriate basketball people in Belgium
American expatriate basketball people in Finland
American expatriate basketball people in Georgia (country)
American expatriate basketball people in Germany
American expatriate basketball people in Greece
American expatriate basketball people in Iran
American expatriate basketball people in Spain
American expatriate basketball people in the Philippines
American expatriate basketball people in Turkey
American expatriate basketball people in Ukraine
Baloncesto Málaga players
Basketball players from North Carolina
BC Kyiv players
BC Oostende players
Beşiktaş men's basketball players
Greek Basket League players
Köln 99ers players
Liga ACB players
Menorca Bàsquet players
Naturalised citizens of Belgium
Peristeri B.C. players
Philippine Basketball Association imports
San Miguel Beermen players
Shooting guards
Siena Saints men's basketball players
Small forwards
Spirou Charleroi players
RBC Pepinster players
American men's basketball players
SC Kryvbas players
21st-century African-American sportspeople
20th-century African-American sportspeople